Henry R. Nau is professor of political science and international affairs at    Elliott School of International Affairs at George Washington University. He is the author of a theory of American foreign policy known as conservative internationalism and a book by the same name.

Biography
Nau was born in 1941. He holds a B.S. degree in economics, politics and science from Massachusetts Institute of Technology, an M.A. from the School of Advanced International Studies (SAIS) at Johns Hopkins University. He received a Ph.D from the same institution in 1972 with a thesis "Politics and peaceful technology in Western Europe: case study of nuclear reactor cooperation."

He was assistant professor at Williams College (1971–73) before coming to George Washington, and has also been visiting professor at Johns Hopkins SAIS, Stanford, and Columbia Universities. During his tenure at the George Washington University, Nau has established a reputation as one of the institution’s leading conservative academics with respect to international relations.

Political work
Since 1989 he has directed the longest standing Congressional parliamentary exchange program with foreign countries, semiannual meetings between Members of the US Congress, Japanese Diet, and Korean National Assembly.  
 
From 1975 to 1977 he  was special assistant to the undersecretary for economic affairs in the U.S. Department of State. From January 1981 to July 1983 in President Reagan's administration, he  worked on international economic affairs as a senior staff member of the National Security Council. He was the White House's personal representative, or sherpa, for the G-7 Economic Summits at Ottawa (1981), Versailles (1982), and Williamsburg (1983) and a special summit with developing countries at Cancun, Mexico (1982).

Books 
Conservative Internationalism: Armed Diplomacy Under Jefferson, Polk, Truman, and Reagan (Princeton University Press, 2013) 
(co-ed. with Deepa Mary Ollapally) Worldviews of Rising Powers: Domestic Foreign Policy Debates in China, India, Iran, Japan, and Russia (Oxford University Press, 2012), 
 Perspectives on International Relations: Power, Institutions, and Ideas (CQ Press, 2011; 3rd Edition) 
 At Home Abroad: Identity and Power in American Foreign Policy] (Cornell University Press, 2002), 
translated into Japanese as アメリカの対外関与 : アイデンティティとパワー / Amerika no taigai kan'yo : Aidentiti to pawā,  published   by Yuhikaku Press, 2006
Trade and Security: US Policies at Cross-Purposes] (American Enterprise Institute Press, 1995)
The Myth of America's Decline: Leading the World Economy into the 1990s (Oxford University Press, 1990 ; paperback with new preface, 1992), The book  predicted the resurgence and preeminence of American economic and military power in the 1990s. David Warsh in The Washington Post, called it “a better guide than the others to the shape of things to come” and praised “its sharp judgments . . . [and] cool-headed prognostications of the future.”. According to WorldCat, the book is held in 994  libraries   
translated into Japanese by Kazuo Ishizeki  as アメリカ没落の神話 / Amerika botsuraku no shinwa   published by TBS Britannica, 1994 
translated into Chinese as 美国衰落的神话 : 领导世界经济进入九十年代 / Meiguo shuai luo de shen hua : ling dao shi jie jing ji jin ru jiu shi nian dai. Beijing Shi : Zhongguo jing ji chu ban she, 1994
(ed.)  Domestic Trade Politics and the Uruguay Round (Columbia University Press, 1989)    
 (ed.) Technology transfer and U.S. foreign policy Praeger, 1976 
National Politics and International Technology: Nuclear Reactor Development in Western Europe (Johns Hopkins University Press, 1974)

References

External links

1941 births
Living people
Paul H. Nitze School of Advanced International Studies alumni
MIT School of Humanities, Arts, and Social Sciences alumni
Elliott School of International Affairs faculty
United States National Security Council staffers
George Washington University faculty
American male writers